

Bracket 
* – Denotes overtime period

Maui Invitational Tournament
Maui Invitational
Maui